Malard-e Jonubi Rural District is in the Central District of Malard County, Tehran province, Iran. At the National Census of 2006, its constituent villages were in the former Malard District of Shahriar County. There were 11,673 inhabitants in 3,227 households at the following census of 2011, by which time the district had been separated from the county and Malard County established. At the most recent census of 2016, the population of the rural district was 12,399 in 3,688 households. The largest of its 11 villages was Bid Kaneh, with 6,193 people.

References 

Malard County

Rural Districts of Tehran Province

Populated places in Tehran Province

Populated places in Malard County

fa:دهستان ملارد جنوبی